Walk Like a Panther is a 2018 British comedy film directed by Dan Cadan and starring Stephen Graham, Jason Flemyng, Julian Sands, Jill Halfpenny, Robbie Gee, Stephen Tompkinson and Sue Johnston. Filming took place in Marsden, a large village in West Yorkshire.

Premise
A group of 1980s wrestlers are forced to don the lycra one last time when their beloved local pub, The Half Nelson, is threatened with closure.

Cast
Stephen Graham as Mark Bolton
Neil Fitzmaurice as Cliff 'Edge' Morris
Jason Flemyng as Ginger Frost
Julian Sands as Tony 'Sweet Cheeks' Smith 
Jill Halfpenny as Lara 'Liplock' Anderson 
Robbie Gee as Zulu Dawn
Christopher Fairbank as Lesley Beck
Stephen Tompkinson as Paul Peterson
Sue Johnston as Gladys
Stephen Marcus as 'Gladiator' Glenn Higgins
Dave Johns as Trevor 'Bulldog' Bolton, Mark's father
Lindsey Coulson as Margaret Bolton, Mark's mother
Adam Fogerty as Danny 'Screwball' Dixon
Rob Parker as Derek 'Corkscrew' Dixon
Steve Furst as Popsy Wilson Jr.
Michael Socha as Ricky Rickson
Peter Martin as Harry 
Scroobius Pip as Terry
Alan Rothwell as Douglas
Ozzie Yue as Percy
Hannah Walters as Gloria Giles

Music
The Seekers - "We Shall Not Be Moved"
Don Harper- "World Of Sport"
Dexy's Midnight Runners - "Geno"
Rick Astley - "Walk like a Panther"
The Coral - "Pass It On"
Temples - "The Golden Throne"
Tim Wheeler - "All Star Throwdown" 
The Lightning Seeds - "Perfect"
Miles Kane - "Don't Forget Who You Are"
Peaches & Herb - "Reunited"
Billy Ocean - "Red Light Spells Danger"
The Housemartins - "The Mighty Ship"
Rick Astley- "Empty Heart"
Adam & The Ants - "Kings of the Wild Frontier"
Jack Trombley - "Eye Level"
Spandau Ballet - "Gold"
Jake Bugg - "Kingpin"
Kasabian - "Comeback Kid"
Noel Gallagher's High Flying Birds - "If Love Is The Law"
The Soft Tone Needles with The Atlantic Horns (featuring Lenny Beige) - "Back In The Game"

Soundtrack
On 8 March 2018, Rick Astley released a song and music video for Walk like a Panther.

Reception
The film holds  approval rating at Rotten Tomatoes.

References

External links
 

British comedy-drama films
Films set in Yorkshire
Films shot in England
Films shot in Yorkshire
2010s English-language films
2010s British films